The New York University School of Law (NYU Law) is the law school of New York University, a private research university in New York City. Established in 1835, it is the oldest law school in New York City and the oldest surviving law school in New York State. Located in Greenwich Village in Lower Manhattan, NYU Law offers J.D., LL.M., and J.S.D. degrees in law.

Globally, NYU Law is ranked as the fifth-best law school in the world by the Academic Ranking of World Universities (ARWU) for subject Law in 2022, after having ranked as the world's fourth-best law school in 2020. In 2017, NYU Law ranked as high as second best in the world by the same benchmark Shanghai Ranking ARWU. NYU Law is also consistently ranked in the top 10 by the QS World University Rankings.  NYU Law is in the list of T14 law schools which has consistently ranked the Law school within the top 7, since U.S. News & World Report began publishing its rankings in 1987. In the SSRN (formerly known as the Social Science Research Network) ranking of the top 350 U.S. Law Schools for 2022, NYU Law ranked third best in the United States. NYU Law has been the leading Law school in the U.S. and in the world in both international law and tax law, consistently ranking the first in both. Additionally, NYU Law is the best law school in the U.S. for the study of criminal law and procedure for 2022. NYU Law ranks first (with a double tie) for business and corporate law in 2022. NYU Law also ranks the first in The Princeton Review rankings of top law schools for Best Career Prospects. NYU School of Law boasts the best overall faculty in the United States, having the leading scholars in every field of the law.

NYU Law alumni include judges at the International Court of Justice, numerous Nobel laureates, prominent US lawyers such as David Boies, and leading human rights practitioners such as Amal Alamuddin Clooney. Some of the leading legal philosophers in the world are currently teaching at NYU Law, including Jeremy Waldron and Thomas Nagel. NYU Law private practice lawyers include the four founders of Wachtell, Lipton, Rosen & Katz, and Cravath, Swaine & Moore partner and former chairman Evan Chesler, the leading law firms in the United States. The current president of the American Civil Liberties Union (ACLU), Deborah N. Archer, is a Clinical Professor and member of the faculty.

NYU Law is known for a significant orientation in public interest. The school's Root-Tilden-Kern Public Interest Law Fellowship is widely recognized as the most prestigious public interest program of its kind.

According to the school's ABA-required disclosures, NYU Law's bar passage rate is 98.7% in 2022, the second highest in the United States.

History 
New York University School of Law was founded in 1835, making it the oldest law school in New York City. It is also the oldest surviving law school in New York State and one of the oldest in the United States. The only law school in the state to precede it was a small institution conducted by Peter van Schaack in Kinderhook, New York, from 1785 to his death in 1832. Founded just four years after the establishment of New York University, NYU Law is also the university's oldest professional school.

The school was founded by Benjamin Franklin Butler, the United States Attorney General, at the request of the Council of the New York University. Butler submitted to the chancellor of the university, James M. Mathews, a "Plan for the organization of a law faculty in the University of the City of New York," which defined a three-year course of study. This plan was formally accepted by the university council on June 2, 1835, marking the inception of the school of law. Instruction began, and Butler was elected the school's first principal professor in March 1838. The curriculum he instituted was the first in the country to teach law using the "course method," which came to be adopted as the standard for legal education in the United States.

NYU School of Law was one of the first law schools in the United States to admit women, beginning in 1890. The Metropolitan Law School was absorbed by NYU School of Law in 1895, and became its evening division. The law school began raising its standards for admission in the early 20th century. In 1924, it required that all students have had completed at least one year of undergraduate education or its equivalent. This was increased to two undergraduate years in 1926, in conformity with the American Bar Association's recommendation.

The law school relocated to its present location of 40 Washington Square South in Greenwich Village in 1951, under the direction of its dean, Arthur T. Vanderbilt. That year, it also established the Root-Tilden-Kern Scholarship for public service.

Academics

NYU Law publishes ten student-edited law journals. The journals appear below in the order of their founding:
 Moot Court Board (which is considered a journal at NYU Law)
 New York University Law Review
 NYU Annual Survey of American Law
 NYU Journal of International Law and Politics
 Review of Law & Social Change
 New York University Environmental Law Journal
 Journal of Legislation & Public Policy
 Journal of Law & Business
 Journal of Law & Liberty
 Journal of Intellectual Property & Entertainment Law

NYU Law also publishes three faculty-edited law journals:
 Clinical Law Review
 The International Journal of Constitutional Law (I·CON)
 Tax Law Review

The law school's Root-Tilden-Kern Scholarship Program is a full-tuition scholarship awarded each year to twenty students committed to public service.

NYU Law offers several fellowships to students admitted to the LLM Program. The Hauser Global Scholarship admits eight to ten top LLM students from all over the world. The scholarship includes full tuition waiver and reasonable accommodation costs. In addition, it offers the Hugo Grotius as well as Vanderbilt scholarships for International law studies and other branches of law respectively.

The school has a law and business program in which eight student-leaders in law and business are awarded fellowships in the Mitchell Jacobson Leadership Program. In addition, the NYU Center for Law, Economics and Organization administers the Lawrence Lederman Fellowship to facilitate the study of Law & Economics the program provides a $5,000 scholarship to selected students to work closely with NYU Law faculty and participate in a series of collaborative workshops designed to help students write a substantial research paper.

NYU Law also hosts the original chapter of the Unemployment Action Center.

LL.M. in Taxation Program
NYU Law School's LL.M. programs in Taxation and in International Taxation have been consistently ranked first by the U.S. News & World Report magazine since they started ranking specialty law school programs in 1992. Brant Hellwig is currently the faculty director of the program.

Tax LL.M. students are permitted to enroll in a general course of study or specialize in specific areas such as business taxation or estate planning. Many of the program's professors are practitioners in their respective fields.

Master of Science (M.S.) in Cybersecurity Risk & Strategy 
The MS in Cybersecurity Risk and Strategy is a one-year program offered jointly by NYU School of Law and NYU Tandon School of Engineering. The program is intended for mid-to-senior level professionals, and cohorts have historically been diverse, professionally and academically. Faculty directors include: Nasir Memon, Randy Milch, and Sam Rascoff. Other notable faculty include: Ed Amoroso, Judi Germano, Zach Goldman, Ira Rubinstein, Rob Silvers, and Chris Sprigman.

Partnerships
More recently, the NYU School of Law has entered into dual degree agreements with the National University of Singapore Faculty of Law and the University of Melbourne Law School.

Oxford University has a program of academic exchanges with New York University School of Law, mainly involving faculty members and research students working in areas of shared interest.

NYU Law offers a dual-degree program with Harvard's John F. Kennedy School of Government. Students may earn a JD/MPA or a JD/MPP.

NYU Law offers a dual-degree program with the Princeton School of Public and International Affairs. Students may earn a JD/MPA.

There is also an exchange program between Columbia Law School and NYU School of Law which allows a limited number of JD and LL.M. students to take courses at each other's schools. Columbia Law and NYU Law also play a basketball game every spring, the Deans' Cup, to raise money for their public interest and community service organizations. NYU Law has taken home the Deans' Cup for the last three tournaments.

Career planning
Graduates of the law school routinely obtain employment in elite public and private-sector positions.

According to New York University School of Law's 2013 ABA-required disclosures, 93.7 percent of the Class of 2013 obtained full-time, long-term, JD-required employment nine months after graduation.

Admissions
More than 11,000 applicants competed for about 480 seats in the 2021 entering class at NYU Law. The 2010 edition of University of Chicago Professor Brian Leiter's ranking of the top law schools by student quality placed NYU Law 4th out of the 144 accredited schools in the United States.

Admission to the New York University School of Law is highly competitive. The 25th and 75th LSAT percentiles for the 2021 entering class were 170 and 174, respectively, with a median of 172. The 25th and 75th undergraduate GPA percentiles were 3.73 and 3.93, respectively, with a median of 3.86.

Facilities

NYU Law School facilities at the school's Washington Square Campus include:

Vanderbilt Hall
The law school's main building, named after Arthur T. Vanderbilt, occupies the entire block between West Third and Washington Square South (West Fourth) and between Macdougal and Sullivan Streets. Part of the first floor as well as the underground floors host the library, which it shares with Furman Hall. The first floor also holds the auditorium, student center, and main banquet hall. The second floor is mostly classrooms, while the third and fourth floors are mostly faculty and dean offices.

Furman Hall
Located on West 3rd Street between Sullivan and Thompson Streets, and on Sullivan and Thompson Streets between West 3rd and West 4th Streets,  Furman Hall opened on January 22, 2004, and is named for alumnus and donor Jay Furman. It connects to Vanderbilt Hall through the law library, part of which is underneath Sullivan Street. The underground level also hosts the Lawyering faculty. Floors one-three have classrooms, lounges, and study space. The fourth floor hosts the career counseling program, and the fifth and sixth floors house the legal practice clinics. The highest floors, generally inaccessible to non-residents, are apartments for faculty and their families. The ninth floor is accessible to students and hosts the Lester Pollack Colloquium room.

The building's West 3rd Street facade incorporates the remaining part of the facade of a townhouse that Edgar Allan Poe lived in from 1844 to 1846, near the site where the house originally stood, the result of a settlement between NYU and preservationists who objected to the university's 2000 plan to tear down the building, which had already lost two stories from the time that Poe dwelled there.

Hayden Residence Hall
Located at 240 Mercer Street, on the southern side of West Third street, adjacent to Broadway, and a couple of blocks east of D'Agostino Hall, Wilf Hall, Furman Hall and Vanderbilt Hall, Hayden Hall houses approximately 500 Law students and faculty. The basement is home to "Mercer Pub" (a room with couches, tables, and a small kitchen that can also be reserved by student groups for social events) and several student run organizations. Hayden is available for summer housing for non-NYU Law students through its Summer Living in New York program.

D'Agostino Residence Hall
Located at the intersection of West Third Street and MacDougal Street in Greenwich Village, D'Agostino Residence Hall houses approximately 300 law students and faculty. It is across the street from the rear of the main law school building, Vanderbilt Hall, and less than 1 block from Wilf Hall and Furman Hall.

Elevators to the apartments are on the highest level, the Front Desk is on the street level, and The Commons (residents' lounge with computers and printers) is on the lower level.  One floor beneath The Commons is the sub-basement, home to most of NYU's legal journals. The second (above-ground) floor, houses numerous administrative offices (Development, Alumni Relations, Special Events, Communications, Human Resources and Financial Services).  Two large function rooms - Lipton Hall and the Faculty Club - are also located in the building.

The law building is named after Filomen D'Agostino, one of the first woman lawyers, who graduated in 1920.  Later in life, Ms. D'Agostino donated $4 million to support residential scholarship and faculty research; the school responded by naming their new apartment building after her.

D'Agostino Hall is also available for summer housing for non-NYU Law students through its Summer Living in New York program.

22 Washington Square North
22 Washington Square North, located in a historic 1830s townhouse on the north side of Washington Square Park in "The Row", houses the Straus Institute for the Advanced Study of Law & Justice, the Jean Monnet Center for International and Regional Economic Law & Justice, and the Tikvah Center for Law & Jewish Civilization.  This building was renovated in 2009 by Morris Adjmi Architects, has a green wall, and should meet silver Leadership in Energy and Environmental Design (LEED) standards.

Wilf Hall
Wilf Hall, at 139 Macdougal Street, houses approximately a dozen of the schools centers, programs and institutes as well as the admissions offices (Graduate and JD).  Per the NYU Law Magazine, it is a "campus destination for faculty, students, and research scholars from an array of disciplines to exchange ideas and, through their work, shape the public discourse around the leading social and political issues of the day."

Wilf Hall also contains the Provincetown Playhouse.  The playhouse opened in the 1920s and premiered many Eugene O'Neil plays.  The theatre is run by NYU's Steinhardt School of Education. The building was designed by Morris Adjmi Architects.

Centers and institutes
NYU Law is home to many centers and institutes, specializing in various areas of law.

 The Brennan Center for Justice is a progressive, non-partisan public policy and law institute that focuses on issues involving democracy and justice.
 The Center for Law, Economics and Organization promotes interdisciplinary research and teaching in law and economics. It is directed by Jennifer Arlen, Oren Bar-Gill, John Ferejohn, Mark Geistfeld, Lewis Kornhauser, and Geoffrey Miller.
 The Reiss Center on Law and Security is an independent, non-partisan, global center of expertise designed to promote an informed understanding of the major legal and security issues that define the post-9/11 environment. The center houses the editorially independent online forum Just Security.  Its fellows include: Peter Bergen, Sidney Blumenthal, Peter Clarke, Roger Cressey, Joshua Dratel, Carol Dysinger, Barton Gellman, Bernard Haykel, Thomas Hegghammer, Brian Palmer, Michael Sheehan, Alexandra Starr, Robert Windrem, and Lawrence Wright. Its former fellows included: Paul Cruickshank, Amos Elon, Baltasar Garzón, Tara McKelvey, Dana Priest, and Nir Rosen.  The Center generates local, national, and international awareness of the legal dimension of security issues, including the Terrorist Trial Report Card, a comprehensive study on every terrorism prosecution in the United States since the September 11, 2001, terrorist attacks.
 Just Security an online forum for analysis of U.S. national security law and policy, is based at the Reiss Center.
 The Center on the Administration of Criminal Law is a think-tank dedicated to the promotion of good government and prosecution practices in criminal matters, with a focus on the exercise of power and discretion by prosecutors.  Its academic component gathers empirical research, publishes scholarship, and organizes and hosts conferences and symposia.  Its litigation component litigate criminal cases or cases having implications for the administration of criminal law, particularly cases in which the exercise of power and discretion by prosecutors raises substantive legal issues.  Its public policy and media component seeks to improve public dialogue on criminal justice matters in various ways, including testifying before public officials and the publishing of op-ed pieces.
 The Furman Center for Real Estate and Urban Policy is a joint venture between the law school and NYU's Robert F. Wagner Graduate School of Public Service. It is an academic research center devoted to the public policy aspects of land use, real estate development and housing.
 The Engelberg Center on Innovation Law and Policy is a center that brings together legal scholars and practitioners, technologists, economists, social scientists, physical scientists, historians, innovators, and industry experts who study, theoretically and empirically, the incentives that motivate innovators, how those incentives vary among different types of creative endeavor, and the laws and policies that help or hinder them. The Engelberg Center is led by faculty members Barton Beebe, Rochelle Dreyfuss, Jeanne Fromer, Scott Hemphill, Jason Schultz, Christopher Sprigman, and Kathy Strandburg, along with Executive Director Michael Weinberg.
 The Hauser Global Law School Program, launched in 1994, has moved NYU School of Law beyond the traditional study of comparative and international law to systematic examination of transnational issues.  The program incorporates non-U.S. and transnational legal perspectives into the law school's curriculum, promotes scholarship on comparative and global law, and brings together faculty, scholars, and students from around the world.
 The Institute for Executive Education offers focused training for professionals and integrates key elements of law, business, and public policy into its programming. Led by Faculty Director Gerald Rosenfeld and Executive Director Erin O’Brien, the institute provides custom programs for organizations. Custom programs allow organizations such as law firms, universities, corporations, NGOs, and government entities to create specialized training for professionals. Notable faculty include: Trevor Morrison, José Alvarez, Preet Bharara, Randy Milch, Kenji Yoshino, Stephen Choi, Jerome Cohen, Mitchell Kane, Philip Alston, David Rosenbloom, Benedict Kingsbury, and Sam Rascoff. 
 The Institute for International Law and Justice integrates the law school's scholarly excellence in international law into the policy activities of the United Nations, non-governmental organizations, law firms, and industry.
 The Institute for Law & Society is a joint venture between the law school and the NYU Graduate School of Arts and Science. It serves as an intellectual center for faculty, graduate students, and law students interested in studying law and legal institutions from an interdisciplinary social science perspective. It offers an opportunity to earn a J.D.-Ph.D or J.D.-M.A. dual degree in law and society.
 The Institute for Policy Integrity is headed by Richard Revesz and Michael Livermore. It advocates for sound cost-benefit analysis at the state, national, and global levels.
 The Pollack Center for Law and Business is a joint venture between the law school and the New York University Stern School of Business. The center is designed to enrich the professional education of students of law and business and to facilitate joint teaching to involve leaders in banking, business, and law in the intellectual life of the university through sponsorship of meetings, conferences and dinners. The Pollack Center also offers a program for students to earn the Advanced Professional Certificate in Law and Business. The director is William T. Allen, a professor at the law school and former Chancellor of the Delaware Court of Chancery.
The State Energy & Environmental Impact Center is an independent non-partisan academic center dedicated to the study and support of state attorneys general in their work defending and promoting clean energy, climate and environmental law and policies. The executive director is Bethany Davis Noll.
 The Straus Institute for the Advanced Study of Law & Justice brings in as Fellows each year approximately 14 leading scholars from different disciplines and cultures. Each year the Straus Institute defines an annual theme that serves as the overarching subject around which the annual fora, colloquia and conference are set. The faculty director is Joseph H. H. Weiler.
 The Tikvah Center for Law & Jewish Civilization is headed by Moshe Halbertal and Joseph H. H. Weiler. The foundational premise of the center is 1) that the study of Jewish law can profit immensely from insights gained from general jurisprudence; and 2) that Jewish law and Jewish civilization can provide illuminating perspectives both on the general study of law as a per se academic discipline, and on the reflection of law as a central social institution refracting the most important issues in our society.
 The U.S.-Asia Law Institute serves as a resource and partner to various Asian countries as they reform and further develop their legal systems and institutions. It also works to improve the understanding of Asian legal systems by lawyers, academics, policy makers and the public. The faculty director is Jerome A. Cohen.
 The Marron Institute is an interdisciplinary and international effort to advance new research and teaching on cities and the urban environment with a focus on enabling cities globally to become more livable, sustainable, and equitable. The Marron Institute seeks to foster collaboration among faculty and researchers university-wide, bringing together the social sciences, humanities and professional schools on new research. The institute also aims to create a vibrant learning community for scholars and students who lead and study urban research.
The Center on Race, Inequality, and the Law works to highlight and dismantle structures and institutions that have been infected by racial bias and plagued by inequality. The Center coordinates curricular development, convenes public conversations, shapes policy by engaging in advocacy, and provides training on issues of race and inequality. The faculty directors are Anthony Thompson and Deborah N. Archer.
The Tax Law Center, led by Executive Director Chye-Ching Huang, works to protect and strengthen the tax system through rigorous, high-impact legal work in the public interest. To do so, the center provides technical input on tax legislation, comments on tax regulations, and submits amicus briefs in tax litigation, with the aim of improving the integrity of the tax system, saving and raising revenues, and advancing equity.

Employment 
According to New York University School of Law's official 2013 ABA-required disclosures, 93.7 percent of the Class of 2013 obtained full-time, long-term, JD-required employment nine months after graduation. NYU Law's Law School Transparency under-employment score is 3 percent, indicating the percentage of the Class of 2013 unemployed, pursuing an additional degree, or working in a non-professional, short-term, or part-time job nine months after graduation.

The law school was ranked sixth of all law schools nationwide by the National Law Journal in terms of sending the highest percentage of 2015 graduates to the largest 100 law firms in the U.S., calculated at 44.5 percent.

Costs
The total cost of attendance (indicating the cost of tuition, fees, and living expenses) at NYU Law for the 2014–2015 academic year is $83,722. The Law School Transparency estimated debt-financed cost of attendance for three years is $309,177.

Faculty
In 2012, NYU Law had the second highest number of faculty who are members of the American Academy of Arts and Sciences with 19 inductees, behind only Harvard.

NYU Law was concluded to have the best overall faculty in the U.S. in a 2018 study conducted by legal scholar J.B. Heaton.

Some of NYU's notable professors include:

 Alberto Alemanno (European Union Law)
 William Allen (Corporate Law, Chancellor of Delaware)
 Philip Alston (Human Rights)
  José Enrique Alvarez (International Law)
 Anthony Amsterdam (Criminal Law, capital punishment)
 Kwame Anthony Appiah (Legal Philosophy)
 Deborah Archer (Racial Justice, Civil Rights)
 Rachel Barkow (Administrative Law, Criminal Law and Procedure)
 Robert Bauer (Law and Politics, Political Reform)
 Dorit Beinisch (National Security Law)
 Jerome A. Cohen (Chinese Law)
 Lawrence Collins (Transnational Litigation)
  Donald Donovan (International Arbitration, International Investment Law)
 Richard Epstein (Law and Economics, Torts, Health Law & Policy)
 Cynthia Estlund (Labor Law, Employment Law, Property)
 Samuel Estreicher (Labor Law, Employment Law, Administrative Law)
 Tali Farhadian (Criminal Law)
 Franco Ferrari (Sale of Goods, European Union Law, International Arbitration)
 Barry Friedman (Constitutional Law, Criminal Law)
 David W. Garland (Criminal Law, Sociology)
 Stephen Gillers (Legal Ethics)
 Douglas H. Ginsburg (Administrative Law)
 Stephen Holmes (liberal democracy)
 Robert Howse (International Law, Legal Theory, International Investment Arbitration, and Globalization Theory)
 Samuel Issacharoff (Procedure, Democracy)
 Sally Katzen (Administrative Law)
 Benedict Kingsbury (International Law)
 John Koeltl (Constitutional Litigation)
 Theodor Meron (International Law)
 Arthur R. Miller (Civil Procedure, Copyright, and Privacy)
 Trevor Morrison (Dean, Constitutional Law)
 Melissa Erica Murray (Constitutional Law)
 Thomas Nagel (Legal Philosophy)
 Burt Neuborne (Evidence, Holocaust Litigation Expert)
 Richard Pildes (Constitutional Law, Election Law)
 Richard Revesz (Environmental Law)
 Samuel Scheffler (Legal Philosophy)
 John Sexton (Civil Procedure)
 Catherine Sharkey (Tort Law, Empirical Legal Studies)
 Linda J. Silberman (Conflict of Laws, Civil Procedure, International Arbitration)
  Christopher Jon Sprigman (Intellectual Property, Torts, Antitrust, Comparative Constitutional Law)
 Bryan Stevenson (Criminal Law, Capital Punishment)
 Jeremy Waldron (Legal Philosophy)
 Joseph H. H. Weiler (International Law)
 Joan Wexler (born 1946), Dean and President of Brooklyn Law School
 Katrina Wyman (Environmental Law, Property Law)
 Kenji Yoshino (Constitutional Law, LGBT Rights)

Notable alumni

Notable alumni include gubernatorial and democratic presidential candidate Samuel J. Tilden;  U.S. Senators Lamar Alexander, Rudy Boschwitz and Jacob Javits; former New York City mayors Fiorello La Guardia, Ed Koch, and Rudy Giuliani; former New York City Councilman and Council Consumer Affairs Committee Chairman David B. Friedland; New York City police commissioner Raymond Kelly; Republic of China President Ma Ying-Jeou; former president of Panama Guillermo Endara; former FBI director Louis Freeh; suffragette and college founding president Jessica Garretson Finch; Centennial Professor of Law at Brooklyn Law School and first female SEC Commissioner Roberta Karmel; sportscaster Howard Cosell; former NFL commissioner Paul Tagliabue; NHL commissioner Gary Bettman; John F. Kennedy, Jr.; Jared Kushner, Special Inspector General of the Troubled Asset Relief Program, Neil Barofsky; U.S. Representatives, such as Hakeem Jeffries; Mitchell Jenkins, Jefferson Monroe Levy, and Isaac Siegel; former chairman of Paramount Pictures Jonathan Dolgen; Hollywood and Broadway producer Marc E. Platt; Hollywood producer and former chairman and CEO of Sony Pictures Entertainment; comedian Demetri Martin (did not graduate); Peter Guber; journalist Glenn Greenwald; civil rights leader Vanita Gupta; president and director-counsel of the NAACP Legal Defense Fund Sherrilyn Ifill; several corporate leaders including Interpublic Group of Companies chairman and CEO Michael I. Roth; ConocoPhillips president and COO John Carrig; Southwest Airlines founder Herb Kelleher; Marvel Entertainment vice-president John Turitzin; and Nobel Peace Prize laureates Elihu Root and Mohamed ElBaradei.

NYU Law alumni have served as judges of the International Court of Justice, popularly known as the World Court, and of the Inter-American Court of Human Rights. Alumni judges include Judith Kaye and Jonathan Lippman, former chief judges of the New York Court of Appeals; Dennis G. Jacobs, chief judge of the United States Court of Appeals for the Second Circuit; Second Circuit Judge Raymond Lohier, and United States Court of Appeals for the Federal Circuit judge, Pauline Newman. NYU Law private practice lawyers include the four founders of Wachtell, Lipton, Rosen & Katz, and Cravath, Swaine & Moore chairman Evan Chesler.

See also
 Law of New York

References

Citations

Sources

External links

 

Environmental law schools
New York University School of Law
New York University School of Law
New York University School of Law
Educational institutions established in 1835
1835 establishments in New York (state)
Greenwich Village